Juan Bueno (born 6 February 1946) is a Mexican former sports shooter. He competed at the 1972, 1976 and the 1980 Summer Olympics.

References

1946 births
Living people
Mexican male sport shooters
Olympic shooters of Mexico
Shooters at the 1972 Summer Olympics
Shooters at the 1976 Summer Olympics
Shooters at the 1980 Summer Olympics
Place of birth missing (living people)
Pan American Games medalists in shooting
Pan American Games bronze medalists for Mexico
Shooters at the 1975 Pan American Games
21st-century Mexican people
20th-century Mexican people